Seglem is a surname. Notable people with the surname include:

Karl Seglem (born 1961), Norwegian musician, composer and producer
Siri Seglem (born 1983), Norwegian handball player